Rintu Thomas is a documentary filmmaker and director-producer from India.

Her documentary Writing with Fire, which she co-directed with Sushmit Ghosh, was the first Indian feature documentary to be nominated for an Academy Award for Best Documentary Feature. The film also won an audience award and special jury award at the 2021 Sundance Film Festival. Thomas is also known for directing Timbaktu, a short documentary which won the National Film Award for the Best Environment Film at the 60th National Film Awards and Dilli, which was awarded Best Documentary at the Jaipur International Film Festival in 2012.

References

External links
 
 Sushmit Ghosh, Tribeca Film Festival

Living people
Year of birth missing (living people)
Indian documentary filmmakers